Chryseobacterium treverense  is a Gram-negative bacteria from the genus of Chryseobacterium which has been isolated from human blood in Trier in Germany.

References

Further reading

External links
Type strain of Chryseobacterium treverense at BacDive -  the Bacterial Diversity Metadatabase

treverense
Bacteria described in 2010